Manut Bumrungphuk (born 5 April 1936) is a Thai sprinter. He competed in the men's 200 metres at the 1956 Summer Olympics.

References

External links
 

1936 births
Living people
Athletes (track and field) at the 1956 Summer Olympics
Athletes (track and field) at the 1960 Summer Olympics
Athletes (track and field) at the 1964 Summer Olympics
Manut Bumrungphuk
Manut Bumrungphuk
Place of birth missing (living people)
Manut Bumrungphuk
Manut Bumrungphuk